John Resig is an American software engineer and entrepreneur, best known as the creator and lead developer of the jQuery JavaScript library. , he works as the chief software architect at Khan Academy.

History
Resig graduated with an undergraduate degree in Computer Science from Rochester Institute of Technology in 2005. During this time he worked with Ankur Teredesai on data mining instant messaging networks and Jon Schull on exploring new ways of encouraging real-time online collaboration.

, Resig has worked as an application developer at Khan Academy. Previously, he was a JavaScript tool developer for the Mozilla Corporation. For his work on jQuery, he was inducted into the Rochester Institute of Technology's Innovation Hall of Fame on April 30, 2010.

Software projects
Resig has started or contributed to many JavaScript libraries, including:
 jQuery a multi-browser JavaScript library designed to simplify the client-side scripting of HTML.
 Processing.js, a port of the Processing language to JavaScript.
 EnvJS, a port of the browser DOM to Rhino.
 TestSwarm, a distributed continuous integration test suite for JavaScript.
 Sizzle, a standalone, pure-JavaScript, CSS selector engine.
 FUEL, a Firefox extension development kit.

Resig is a frequent guest speaker at companies like Google and Yahoo! and has presented at many conferences related to web technology, including SXSW, Webstock, MIX, and Tech4Africa.

Publications
Resig is the author of a blog, and is the author of the book Pro JavaScript Techniques, published by Apress in 2006, Secrets of the JavaScript Ninja with Bear Bibeault, published by Manning Publications in December 2012 and several other papers.

References

External links

 John Resig - About Me
 FUEL
 
 

1984 births
American bloggers
American technology writers
Computer programmers
Web developers
Living people
Mozilla developers
Place of birth missing (living people)
Rochester Institute of Technology alumni
Technology evangelists
People associated with JavaScript
21st-century American non-fiction writers